Pearson  is an English surname at Norman conquest of England period, and may refer to many people.

Surname

A
Aaron Pearson (born 1964), American football player
Adam Pearson (disambiguation), multiple people
Albert Pearson (disambiguation), multiple people
Albie Pearson (1934–2023), American baseball player
Alf Pearson (1910–2012), English variety performer
Alfred Pearson (disambiguation), multiple people
Alister Pearson, British illustrator
Allison Pearson (born 1960), British journalist
Andrew Pearson (disambiguation), multiple people
Anthony Pearson (disambiguation), multiple people
April Pearson (born 1989), British actress
Arthur Pearson (disambiguation), multiple people

B
Beatrice Pearson (1920–1986), American actress
Benjamin Pearson (disambiguation), multiple people
Bernard Pearson (born 1946), British potter
Bill Pearson (disambiguation), multiple people
Billy Pearson (1920–2002), American jockey
Billy Pearson (footballer) (1921–2009), English footballer
Bird M. Pearson (1803–1859), American judge
Bob Pearson (1907–1985), English variety performer
Brian Pearson (disambiguation), multiple people
Bryan Pearson (disambiguation), multiple people

C
Carlton Pearson (born 1953), American evangelical minister
Carol Lynn Pearson (born 1939), American poet and playwright
Charles Pearson (disambiguation), multiple people
Chris Pearson (disambiguation), multiple people
CJ Pearson (born 2002), American activist
Colin Pearson (disambiguation), multiple people
Corey Pearson (born 1973), Australian rugby league footballer

D
Dan Pearson (disambiguation), multiple people
Daniel Pearson (disambiguation), multiple people
Danny Pearson (disambiguation), multiple people
David Pearson (disambiguation), multiple people
Denise Pearson (born 1968), British singer-songwriter
Derrick Pearson, American sports commentator
Digby Pearson (born 1962), British record label executive
Don Pearson, American management consultant
Drew Pearson (disambiguation), multiple people
Duke Pearson (1932–1980), American jazz musician

E
Edmund Pearson (1880–1937), American librarian and author
Edward Pearson (disambiguation), multiple people
Egon Pearson (1895–1980), British statistician
Eric Pearson (born 1984), American screenwriter
Ethel Pearson (1870–1959), British humanitarian

F
Frank Pearson (1937–2003), British drag queen
Frederick Pearson (disambiguation), multiple people

G
Gary Pearson (disambiguation), multiple people
George Pearson (disambiguation), multiple people
Geoffrey Pearson (1927–2008), Canadian diplomat
Gerald Pearson (1901–1987), American physicist
Greg Pearson (born 1985), English footballer

H
Harold Pearson (disambiguation), multiple people
Harry Pearson (disambiguation), multiple people
Henry Pearson (disambiguation), multiple people
Herb Pearson (1910–2006), New Zealand cricketer
Hesketh Pearson (1887–1964), British biographer
Hugh Pearson (disambiguation), multiple people
Humphrey Pearson (1893–1937), American screenwriter and playwright

I
Ian Pearson (disambiguation), multiple people
Isaac N. Pearson (1842–1908), American politician
Isabelle Pearson (born 1981), Canadian judoka
Issette Pearson (1861–1941), English golfer

J
Jack Pearson (1922–2007), English cricketer
James Pearson (disambiguation), multiple people
Jerome Pearson (born 1938), American engineer
Joe Pearson (disambiguation), multiple people
John Pearson (disambiguation), multiple people
Johnny Pearson (1925–2011), British composer and pianist
Joseph Pearson (disambiguation), multiple people
Josh Pearson (born 1997), American football player
Josh T. Pearson (born 1974), American musician
Justin Pearson (born 1975), American rock musician

K
Karl Pearson (1857–1936), British statistician
Kayleigh Pearson (born 1985), English model
Kenneth Pearson (born 1951), English cricketer
Kevin Pearson (disambiguation), multiple people

L
Landon Pearson (born 1930), Canadian politician
Larry Pearson (born 1953), American NASCAR driver
Lars Pearson (born 1973), American publisher
Les Pearson, English footballer
Lester B. Pearson (1897–1972), Canadian politician
Linda Pearson (born 1964), Scottish sport shooter
Linley E. Pearson (born 1946), American politician
Lloyd Pearson (1897–1966), British actor
Luke Pearson (born 1987), British cartoonist

M
Malcolm Pearson (born 1942), British businessman and politician
Maria Pearson (1932–2003), American native activist
Mark Pearson (disambiguation), multiple people
Martin Pearson (born 1971), Welsh rugby league footballer
Mary Pearson (disambiguation), multiple people
Maryon Pearson (1901–1989), English wife of Lester Bowles Pearson
Megan Pearson, British actress
Michael Pearson (disambiguation), multiple people
Michelle Pearson (born 1962), Australian swimmer
Monte Pearson (1908–1978), American baseball player

N
Nancy Pearson (nee Wallace), American curler
Nate Pearson (born 1996), American baseball pitcher
Neil Pearson (born 1959), English actor
Nick Pearson (born 1979), American speed skater
Nigel Pearson (born 1963), English football manager
Noel Pearson (born 1965), Australian lawyer
Noel Pearson (producer), Irish film and theatre producer

O
Oliver Paynie Pearson (1915–2003), zoologist

P
Patricia Pearson (born 1964), Canadian journalist
Patrick Pearson (born 1930), British philatelist
Paul Pearson (disambiguation), multiple people
Pepe Pearson (born 1975), American football player
Peter Pearson (disambiguation), multiple people
Philip Pearson (disambiguation), multiple people
Preston Pearson (born 1945), American football player
Puggy Pearson (1929–2006), American poker player

R
Ralph Pearson (1919–2022), American chemist
Raymond A. Pearson (1873–1939), American academic administrator
Richard Pearson (disambiguation), multiple people
Rick Pearson (disambiguation), multiple people
Ridley Pearson (born 1953), American writer
Robert Pearson (disambiguation), multiple people
Roger Pearson (disambiguation), multiple people
Ronald Hayes Pearson (1924 – 1996) was an American designer, jeweler, and metalsmith.
Ross Pearson (born 1984), English mixed martial artist
Ryan Pearson (disambiguation), multiple people

S
Samuel Pearson (1814–1884), English entrepreneur
Scott Pearson (born 1969), Canadian ice hockey player
Stan Pearson (1919–1997), English footballer
Stedman Pearson (born 1964), English singer
Stephen Pearson (born 1982), Scottish footballer
Steven Pearson, American physician
Stuart Pearson (disambiguation), multiple people
Sally Pearson (born 1986), Australian runner

T
Tanner Pearson (born 1992), Canadian ice hockey player
T. R. Pearson (born 1956), American novelist
Ted Pearson (born 1948), American poet
Thomas Pearson (disambiguation), multiple people
Tilian Pearson (born 1987), American singer
Todd Pearson (born 1977), Australian swimmer
Tony Pearson (disambiguation), multiple people
Travis Pearson (born 1971), American football player
Trevor Pearson (born 1952), English footballer
Trevor Pearson (cricketer) (born 1943), Australian cricketer

V
Virginia Pearson (1886–1958), American actress

W
Weetman Pearson (1856–1927), English engineer and oil industrialist
Wilf Pearson, English footballer
Will Pearson (born 1979), American magazine owner
William Pearson (disambiguation), multiple people
Willie Pearson Jr. (born 1945), American sociologist

Z
Zachariah Pearson (1821–1891), English shipowner

See also
Peirson, given name and surname
Pierson (surname)
List of This Is Us characters

English-language surnames
Surnames from given names
de:Pearson
fr:Pearson
nl:Pearson
ja:ピアソン